Lisa Raymond and Rennae Stubbs successfully defended their title by winning in the final 6–7 (5–7), 7–6 (8–6), 6–2 over Cara Black and Elena Likhovtseva.

Seeds
Champion seeds are indicated in bold text while text in italics indicates the round in which those seeds were eliminated.

 Lisa Raymond /  Rennae Stubbs (champions)
 Cara Black /  Elena Likhovtseva (final)
 Kimberly Po-Messerli /  Nathalie Tauziat (quarterfinals)
 Nicole Pratt /  Ai Sugiyama (semifinals)

Draw

External links
2002 Britannic Asset Management International Championships Doubles draw

Doubles
Britannic Asset Management International Championships